Kistanje is a village and municipality in Šibenik-Knin County, Croatia.

Geography

Kistanje is located in the microregion of Bukovica, in Zagora. The climate is Mediterranean, with an average of 27 °C in the summer and 8 °C in the winter.

History

It originated close to the remains of a Roman camp Burnum and medieval church. During the Middle Ages, it was part of Luka parish and it belonged to Šubić noble family. In 1537, an Orthodox church dedicated to St. Nicholas was built. Kistanje was a trade center of this part of Bukovica. After the Kuridža rebellion in 1704, the village was renamed Kvartir; in the 19th century, it was again known as Kistanje. In 1888, the second Orthodox church, dedicated to Sts Cyril and Methodius was built. In 1894, the Catholic Church of Our Lady of Health was built. In the 19th and the first part of the 20th century, Kistanje was the centre of a municipality that was abolished in the 1960s. The municipality and its territory were joined to the municipality of Knin.

During the Croatian War of Independence, local Serb rebels held the village until its capture by the Croatian Army during Operation Storm on 5 August 1995. During this period, the Church of Our Lady of Health was devastated, and most of the non-Serb population fled. The village remained under the control of so called Republic of Serbian Krajina until 1995, when it suffered heavy damage in battle, and some of the local civilians were killed (see Varivode massacre), while others fled.

In 1997, Kistanje became a municipality within the Šibenik-Knin County. In 1997, around 1,000 Croats from Janjevo in Kosovo were settled in the village. In 2003, the second Catholic church, the Church of Saint Nicholas was dedicated.

Population

According to the 2011 census, the municipality of Kistanje had 3,481 inhabitants, who lived in 14 villages:

 Biovičino Selo – population 223
 Đevrske – population 293
 Gošić – population 46
 Ivoševci – population 360
 Kakanj – population 49
 Kistanje – population 1,909
 Kolašac – population 50
 Krnjeuve – population 74
 Modrino Selo – population 47
 Nunić – population 110
 Parčić – population 22
 Smrdelje – population 111
 Varivode – population 124
 Zečevo – population 63

In the 2011 census, there were 3,481 inhabitants of Kistanje municipality, 62.22% Serbs and 36.83% Croats.

Historical census for Kistanje municipality is:

Politics
The municipality council has 14 seats, out of which 10 are Independent Democratic Serb Party (SDSS), 3 are Croatian Democratic Union (HDZ), and 1 is Croatian Social Liberal Party (HSLS). The mayor of Kistanje, since 2012, is Goran Reljić (SDSS).

Notable people

Prominent individuals that were born or that have lived either in Kistanje or the surrounding villages include:

Vuk Mandušić
Petar Jagodić Kuridža
Vladimir Ardalić
Mirko Korolija
Simo Dubajić
Predrag Šarić

Gallery

See also

 Burnum
 Krka Monastery, Serbian Orthodox monastery dedicated to the Archangel Michael located 2.5 km from Kistanje near the Krka river.
 Krka Manojlovac Waterfall

References

External links 
 
 

Municipalities of Croatia
Populated places in Šibenik-Knin County
Serb communities in Croatia